Pterolophia chapaensis is a species of beetle in the family Cerambycidae. It was described by Maurice Pic in 1929.

References

chapaensis
Beetles described in 1929